John Thomas Brown (15 June 1901 – 1977) was an English footballer. He played as a full back for Leicester City, Wrexham, Nuneaton Town and Heanor Town.

He was part of the Leicester City side which finished in what was until 2016 the club's highest ever league finish, of runners-up in 1928-29.

References

1901 births
1977 deaths
People from Eastwood, Nottinghamshire
Footballers from Nottinghamshire
Association football fullbacks
English footballers
Leicester City F.C. players
Wrexham A.F.C. players
Nuneaton Borough F.C. players
Heanor Town F.C. players
English Football League players